Mohamed Amine Ben Amor (born 3 May 1992) is a Tunisian professional  who plays as a midfielder for Étoile du Sahel and the Tunisia national team.

Club career
Ben Amor was born in Sousse, Tunisia, and started his career at Étoile Sportive du Sahel in 2014 under Faouzi Benzarti. During his spell there, he was a fan favourite despite being one of the youngest players in the team. He scored 2 goals with his team in 60 appearances. He was decisive in deciding many titles for his team like 2015 CAF Confederation Cup, Tunisian League, and Tunisian Cup.

International career
His success with his team led him to the Tunisian national team for the first time by coach Georges Leekens on 15 June 2015 against Morocco in 2016 African Nations Championship qualification. He scored his first goal against Niger in the group stage of this competition so that Tunisia reached the quarter-finals.

Had been injured just before the 2017 Africa Cup of Nations held in Gabon, which prevented him from participating in the first game against Senegal, where Tunisia was defeated (0-2). He returned in the match Algeria and contributed significantly to the qualification of his team for the quarter-finals of the competition and was selected as one of the best players of the tournament with the testimony of many football analysts.

He made a big contribution to making his team closer to qualifying for the 2018 FIFA World Cup in Russia after striking a ball which hit the Congolese player Wilfred Moke and entered the net in Kinshasa before scoring a goal against Guinea in Conakry. In June 2018 he was named in Tunisia’s 23-man squad for the 2018 FIFA World Cup in Russia.

Career statistics

International

International goals
Scores and results list Tunisia's goal tally first.

Honours
ES Sahel
Tunisian Ligue Professionnelle 1: 2016
Tunisian Cup: 2014, 2015
CAF Confederation Cup: 2015

References

External links
 
 Profile at coaching-foot.com

1992 births
Living people
2017 Africa Cup of Nations players
Tunisian footballers
Tunisia international footballers
People from Sousse
Association football midfielders
Al-Ahli Saudi FC players
Saudi Professional League players
Tunisian expatriate footballers
Expatriate footballers in Saudi Arabia
Tunisian expatriate sportspeople in Saudi Arabia
2018 FIFA World Cup players
Étoile Sportive du Sahel players
Tunisian Ligue Professionnelle 1 players
2016 African Nations Championship players
Tunisia A' international footballers